Kismet (meaning "Destiny"), is the first studio album by musician Jesca Hoop, released on September 17, 2007 through RED Ink Records. The song "Love and Love Again" was co-written with David Baerwald while Stewart Copeland guests on the song "Seed Of Wonder." The song "Intelligentactile 101" was released prior to the album. According to Hoop, many of the songs on the album were "quite old." "Out the Back Door," a combination of early 20s jazz and hip hop, is a song she "wrote years ago, and then the movie Idlewild came out and it kind of reinforced my concept in that arena," explained Hoop.

Track listing

Personnel

 Jesca Hoop – vocals, guitar (tracks 1-9)
 Ian Walker – bass (tracks 1, 4, 6, 7, 9)
 Matt Chamberlain – drums (tracks 1, 5, 6 to 8, 10)
 Patrick Warren – keyboards(tracks: 5, 6, 9, 11), horns, accordion (track 7)
 Blake Mills – guitar (track 1), bass, electric guitar (track 5)
 Tony Berg – zither (track 1), harmonium (track 3), guitar, keyboards (track 8)
 Sam Farrar – bass (track 2, 8)
 Stewart Copeland – drums (track 2) 
 Quinn Smith – drums (track 4, 9)
 Roddy Cabello – guitar (track 4)
 Frank Lenz – vibraphone, wind instruments (track 4)
 Yoshida Brothers – shamisen (track 8)
 Cedric Lemoyne – bass (track 10)
 José Pasillas – drums (track 10)
 Sasha Smith – piano (track 10)
 Damian Anthony – programming (track 10)
 David Baerwald – keyboards, mandolin, twelve-string guitar (track 11)

Technical personnel
 Damian Anthony - engineering and additional engineering (tracks 1,2,3,4,5,6,7,8,9,10)
 Shawn Everett - engineering (tracks 1, 2, 5 to 8 and 10), mixing
 Eric Valentine - additional engineering
 Gabe Butler - additional engineering
 Jake Davies - additional engineering
 David Baerwald - engineering (track 11)
 Jesca Hoop - production
 Damian Anthony - production
 Tony Berg - production
 Brian Gardner - mastering

 Design
 Jesca Hoop - art direction
 Dave Bett - art direction 
 Alex Berg - illustrations
 Claudia Kunin, illustrations
 Nicholas Rubin - illustrations
 Christina Rodriguez - design
 Frank Ockenfels - photography
 Damian Anthony - photography (cover)
 Dan Parker - photography (inside)

References 

Jesca Hoop albums
2007 debut albums